Abdulahad Malik (born 9 August 1986) is an Indian cricketer who plays for Gujarat and the Rajasthan Royals.

Born in Hansot, Gujarat, Malik's appearances have been restricted in the IPL due to the presence of Naman Ojha. He is one of the current 3 Rajasthan Royals Wicketkeepers.

In 2013 he along with Manpreet Juneja set the highest ever 4th wicket partnership in any forms of T20 cricket (202)

References

1986 births
Living people
People from Bharuch district
Indian cricketers
Gujarat cricketers